Milton is a hamlet in Stirling, Scotland near Aberfoyle situated above the River Forth.  In 1961 it had a population of 98. Most pupils attend Aberfoyle Primary School. Older pupils usually attend McLaren High School, Callander.

The derelict Milton Mill with its 14-foot cast iron wheel dates from 1667.

References

External links

Canmore – Forth House, Milton, Aberfoyle site record
Canmore – Milton, Jean Macalpine's Inn site record

Hamlets in Stirling (council area)
Trossachs